Jerzy Prószyński (born 1935 in Warsaw) is a Polish arachnologist specializing in systematics of jumping spiders (family Salticidae).  He is a graduate of the University of Warsaw, a long-term employee of the Siedlce University of Natural Sciences and Humanities and the Institute of Zoology of the Polish Academy of Sciences in Warsaw.

Biography

In 1957 he completed his biological studies at the University of Warsaw.  During his studies he was employed at the Institute of Zoology of the Polish Academy of Sciences in Warsaw, where he conducted research on spiders in the Kampinos Forest.  Between 1963 and 1967 he lectured on zoology at the University of Ghana.  In 1966 he obtained his Ph.D. at the Adam Mickiewicz University in Poznań.  A year later he was given the opportunity to pursue a postdoctoral fellowship at Harvard University, but he was refused a passport.

In 1972 he was employed at the Higher School of Education in Siedlce (later the Siedlce University of Natural Sciences and Humanities), where he headed up the newly created Faculty of Biology.

In 1992 he was re-employed at the Institute of Zoology of the Polish Academy of Sciences in Warsaw.

Scientific achievements

Since 1960 Prószyński's scientific activity has focused on the taxonomy, systematics and biogeography of jumping spiders. He is the author of several dozen scientific publications and academic textbooks and of an online database of the Salticidae of the world. , the World Spider Catalog listed 43 genus names and 216 species names or synonyms of which he is either a co-author or the sole author.

In 2010 he received the Pierre Bonnet Award for outstanding achievements in the field of arachnology.

References

External links
  – list of publications
 

1935 births
Living people
Polish arachnologists
20th-century Polish zoologists
Salticidae